Aleksandar Selkić (Serbian Cyrillic: Александар Селкић; born 24 May 1983) is a Swiss-Serbian former footballer.

Football career
Selkić started his youth football career with FC Solothurn. After playing for Zurich Grasshoppers and FC Zurich, he was sold to FC Spartak Moscow where he played 3 seasons. He also played for the Yugoslavian national team from 1998 - 2002 where he participated in the UEFA European Championship where the team placed 4th. After leaving FC Spartak Moscow, he signed with Serbian top league club FK Železnik, where he played in the 2004–05 UEFA Cup, and won the Serbia and Montenegro Cup.

Selkić exited professional football in 2005 due to a series of injuries.

Professional career
Selkić moved back to Switzerland where he held various positions in telecommunications and insurance before moving to private banking. He worked for Bank Sarasin, UBS, Credit Suisse, Vontobel in private banking & wealth management as a relationship manager to high and ultra high net worth individuals.

Political career
Selkić joined Free Democratic Party (FDP) of Switzerland in 2016. He ran for office of the Grand communal council in 2018. Since he has been an integral member of the election campaign team.

References

External links
  Player page on FC Spartak Moscow website
Yugoslavia U-19 match at Archive.uefa.com

1983 births
Living people
Serbian footballers
Serbian expatriate footballers
FK Železnik players
FC Spartak Moscow players
Expatriate footballers in Russia
Association football defenders